Budapesti Egyetemi Atlétikai Club (English: Budapest University Athletic Club) is a Hungarian football club from the city of Budapest. The club was founded by the Eötvös Loránd University.

History
Budapesti EAC debuted in the 1924–25 season of the Hungarian League and finished ninth.

Name changes
1898–1948: Budapesti Egyetemi Athletikai Club
1948–1949: Természettudományi MEFESz
1949: merger with Műegyetemi MEFESz
1949–1950: Budapesti MEFESz
1950–1951: Disz FSE
1951: merger with Műegyetemi AFC
1951–1957: Budapesti Haladás SK
1957–present: Budapesti Egyetemi AC

Honours
Hungarian Cup:
 Runner-up (1) :1925–26

Managers
 Pál Várhidi

Notable members
Peter Bakonyi

References

External links
 Profile

Football clubs in Budapest
1898 establishments in Hungary